Salyer (Hupa: Miy-me’) is an unincorporated community in Trinity County, California. Its population is 389 as of the 2020 census. For statistical purposes, the United States Census Bureau has defined Salyer as a census-designated place (CDP). The census definition of the area may not precisely correspond to local understanding of the area with the same name.

History
Salyer was established on April 16, 1918, and named for Charles Marshall Salyer, a prominent miner.
Salyer is located in the ancestral territory of the Tsnungwe Tribe and is next to the Tsnungwe village of miy-me'.  Prior to being named Salyer, a Tsnungwe Indian Dickson Dartt proposed the area be named after the village of miy-me.

The ZIP Code is 95563. The community is inside area code 530.

Government

Climate
This region experiences warm (but not hot) and dry summers, with no average monthly temperatures above 71.6 °F.  According to the Köppen Climate Classification system, Salyer has a warm-summer Mediterranean climate, abbreviated "Csb" on climate maps.

See also
Trinity County, California

References

Unincorporated communities in California
Unincorporated communities in Trinity County, California
1918 establishments in California
Populated places established in 1918